The Mono Grande (Spanish for "Large Monkey"), a large monkey-like creature, has been occasionally reported in South America. Such creatures are reported as being much larger than the commonly accepted New World monkeys. These accounts have received rather little publicity, and typically generated little or no interest from experts.

Older reports and sightings
The German naturalist Alexander von Humboldt, who travelled in South America during early 19th century, heard stories from Orinoco about furry human-like creatures called Salvaje ("Wild"), which were rumoured to capture women, build huts and to occasionally eat human flesh. He attached no belief to the myth. The naturalist Philip Gosse also tried to examine these legends during his travels in Venezuela during the mid-19th century, but with no real success (Sjögren, 1980).

Modern reports and sightings
The so-called Loys' Ape was photographed in 1920; it has since been identified as a spider monkey. In 1931, inspired by Loys' ape, three Italians made an expedition to the Mazaruni River in Guyana, but without further evidence than more alleged sightings from the residents. Bengt Sjögren writes (1980) that: "They returned home with a couple of eyewitness-reports, that give the impression that the interviewed tried to make fun of  them."

An American millionaire also set up a reward of 50,000 dollars to the one who could find a specimen, but nobody seems to have claimed the reward. The American scientist Philip Herschkowitz, who traveled in the same areas as de Loys, concluded that the story was a myth whose origin was the spider monkey, Ateles belzebuth. However, in 1951, a Frenchman named Roger Courteville claimed to have seen an apeman at the same Tarra River where de Loys said he had seen his creatures. Like de Loys, he presented a photograph of the creature as evidence. According to Sjögren (1980) the photo was a hoax, a manipulated version of de Loys photograph.

In 1987, Gary Samuels (a mycologist studying under a grant from the New York Botanical Garden) was studying fungi in Guyana. Hearing footsteps nearby, he glanced up, expecting to see his Guyanese assistant. Instead, he saw a bipedal, ape-like creature standing about five feet tall. Samuels said the creature bellowed at him, then ran away.

Criticism
As mentioned above, Humboldt considered the reports of Salvaje to be just myths that came to South America with European colonists. The Swedish author Rolf Blomberg speculates (1966) that rumours of hidden monsters in the Amazon basin might have been inspired by Arthur Conan Doyle's book The Lost World (1912) combined with exaggerated reports of sightings of unusually large spider monkeys (Sjögren, 1980), and Bengt Sjögren (1962) remarked: "For critically educated zoologists is of course all this 'ape mystery' just a good joke".

Beyond humans, hominids (Hominoidea) are restricted to the Old World, while the New World is populated by smaller, often arboreal monkeys with long tails and flatter noses (Platyrrhini).

See also
Loys Ape
Spider monkey

References

Sources

Rolf Blomberg, "Rio Amazonas", Almqvist&Wiksell, 1966.
Michael Shoemaker, "The Mystery of Mono Grande", Strange Magazine, April 1991.
Sjögren, Bengt, "Farliga djur och djur som inte finns", 1962
Sjögren, Bengt, Berömda vidunder, Settern, 1980,  
Pino Turolla, "Beyond The Andes", Harper & Row, 1980.

South American folklore
Spanish-language South American legendary creatures
Hominid cryptids